is a former Japanese former professional boxer who competed from 1993 to 2001. He is a world champion in two weight classes, having held the WBA super-featherweight title from 1998 to 1999 and the WBA lightweight title from 2001 and 2001.

Personal life
Hatakeyama played baseball throughout his childhood, wanting to become a professional baseball player when he grew up. However, a boxing match he saw on television made him take an interest in boxing. He decided to become a professional boxer after seeing Joichiro Tatsuyoshi win the WBC bantamweight title. He quit high school, moving to Tokyo to begin serious training.

Professional career
He made his professional debut at age 17 in June 1993, without a single fight as an amateur. He won the OPBF Super Featherweight title in 1996, and challenged the WBA Super Featherweight champion Yong-Soo Choi in 1997. The fight was a close draw, and Choi retained his title.

Hatakeyama challenged the Japanese super-featherweight champion in March 1998, winning by 9th-round TKO. He immediately returned his title to prepare for another world title match. He fought Yong-Soo Choi again for the WBA title on September 5, 1998, this time winning by decision to gain his first world title.

Hatakeyama made his first defense with a draw, but lost his second defense match against the mandatory challenger Lakva Sim in 1999. He announced his retirement after the fight, but resumed training in 2000, moving up to the lightweight division.

Hatakeyama's first fight after returning from retirement was a world title match, fighting Gilberto Serrano for the WBA lightweight title on June 11, 2000. He won by technical knockout in the 8th round, becoming the fourth Japanese boxer to have captured world titles in two different weight classes. Hatakeyama chose fellow Japanese boxer Hiroyuki Sakamoto to challenge his title, and the two fought an epic fight in October, 2000. Hatakeyama win Sakamoto by TKO in the 10th round, making his first defense.

In February, 2001, he fought American born fighter Rick Yoshimura, who had defended the Japanese lightweight title 22 consecutive times. Hatakeyama managed to keep his title with a draw, but Yoshimura would have won the fight if he had not lost a point for a foul. In July, 2001, he fought former lightweight champion and mandatory challenger Julien Lorcy for his third defense. Hatakeyama pushed Lorcy against the ropes several times, but was pummeled repeatedly by Lorcy, and lost the fight by decision. Hatakeyama officially retired after the fight at the young age of 25. His record was 24-2-3 (19 KO).

Post retirement
Hatakeyama has succeeded in several careers after retiring from boxing. He opened an amateur boxing gym with former WBA Middleweight champion Shinji Takehara, and occasionally appears on television shows. He works as a special staff member for a boxing and fitness gym in Kyoto, personally teaching classes once or twice a month. He married announcer Kumiko Kiyohara on June 17, 2006, and his first son was born in September of the same year. Hatakeyama has another son, born with his former wife in 1996. He also appears as a commentator for K-1 WORLD MAX events. He is known to be an avid fan of the Rakuten Eagles baseball team, and currently attends Aomori University to obtain a bachelor's degree.

Professional boxing record

See also 
List of WBA world champions
List of super featherweight boxing champions
List of lightweight boxing champions
List of Japanese boxing world champions
Boxing in Japan

External links
 

1975 births
Living people
People from Aomori (city)
World lightweight boxing champions
World super-featherweight boxing champions
Japanese male boxers
Aomori University alumni